Juntree Siriboonrod (March 31, 1917 – March 13, 1968) was a Thai novelist. He is regarded as the "father of Thai science fiction".

Life 

Juntree began his career as a civil servant in the Mineral Fuels Division (now the Department of Mineral Fuels of the Ministry of Energy) of the Thai government. He began writing novels and science-related articles in limited circulation as a senior high school science teacher at the Kenneth Mackensie School in Lampang Province. In 1945, he collaborated on the magazine Witthayasat Mahatsachan alongside Dr Preecha Amatyakul, then Assistant Secretariat of the Science Society of Thailand. Under this name he published works of science fiction, science-related articles and biographies on scientists, continuing to do so until his resignation in 1959.

Works 

 Lok Thalom
 Phu Dap Duang Athit*
 Phu Phop Phaendin*
 Manut Khu
 Phu Sang Anakhot
Works marked with an asterisk were selected for the 88 Good Thai Science Books list.

Juntree Siriboonrod Award 

In 2005, Nanmee Books Co. Ltd. along with the Science Writers & Publisher Forum (SciPub), the Science Society of Thailand Under the Patronage of His Majesty the King, the Junior Science Talent Project (JSTP) and the Thailand National Science and Technology Development Agency established the Juntree Siriboonrod Award for achievements in the field of Thai science fiction.

References 

1917 births
1968 deaths
Juntree Siriboonrod
Juntree Siriboonrod
Juntree Siriboonrod
20th-century novelists
20th-century short story writers
20th-century male writers